Atriplex fissivalvis, commonly known as gibber saltbush, is a plant species in the  family Amaranthaceae, subfamily, Chenopodioideae. It occurs   in the Australian states of South Australia, New South Wales, Queensland and the Northern Territory.

Description
It flowers in clusters in the axils of leaves, from June to November (in the Northern Territory).  Fruiting is from June to November (in the Territory), and the fruit is without a stem and enclosed in bracteoles.

Distribution
In the Northern Territory it is found in the IBRA regions of Finke, MacDonnell Ranges, Simpson Strzelecki Dunefields, and Stony Plains.

Taxonomy & naming
Atriplex fissivalvis was first described by Mueller in 1875. The specific epithet, fissivalvis, comes from the Latin, fissus (cleft) and -valvis (-valved), giving "split-valved".

Similar taxa
"Atriplex fissivalvis could be confused with A. lobativalvis, however the latter has fruiting bracteoles that lack appendages on the dorsal surface, are prominently keeled or have a raised area on the lower dorsal surface, have margins that are fused for over one-third their length, and has a preference for freshwater swamps and claypans."

Conservation status
The Northern Territory lists this species as "Near Threatened" under the TPWCA act.

References

External links
AVH Occurrence data: Atriplex fissivalvis

fissivalvis
Flora of New South Wales
Flora of South Australia
Flora of Queensland
Flora of the Northern Territory
Caryophyllales of Australia
Taxa named by Ferdinand von Mueller